Well To The Bone is a 2002 album by fusion/jazz guitarist Scott Henderson. It is his third solo-album, again returning to his blues-roots.
It features a re-recording of the Tribal Tech song "Rituals".

Track listing
"Lady P" – 7:14
"Hillbilly in the Band" – 5:06
"Devil Boy" – 6:41
"Lola Fay" – 6:24
"Well to the Bone" – 4:50
"Ashes" – 6:53
"Sultan's Boogie" – 6:30
"Dat's Da Way It Go" – 6:54
"That Hurts" – 6:16
"Rituals" – 8:01

Personnel
 Scott Henderson - guitars
 Kirk Covington - drums and vocals
 John Humphrey - bass guitar
 Thelma Houston - vocals on "Lola Fay", "Well To The Bone", "Dat's Da Way It Go"
 Wade Durham - vocals on "Lady P", "Devil Boy", "Dat's Da Way It Go"
 Scott Kinsey - electronic percussion

References

External links
 George Graham Review for WVIA-FM
 Lyrics on Alf Frimanslund's Scott Henderson webpage

2002 albums
Scott Henderson albums
Albums produced by Scott Henderson
Albums produced by Mike Varney